"Rain" is the seventeenth single by Japanese pop singer-songwriter Yui. It was released on November 24, 2010. The title song is a tie-in for the Fuji TV drama series Perfect Report. The single reached number 2 on the Oricon chart.

Music video and lyrics 

The music video for "Rain" alternates between cuts of Yui and her band playing in the rain and Yui herself running through a rainy street towards a Christmas gift shop. Around the middle of the music video, a happier past is shown through flashbacks of Yui smiling and receiving earrings on a sunny day, along with the lines: "They try to bring back memories / Which are already gone / No matter what I do, I can't get rid of the past." The video eventually ends with an image of hope for the future, with the lyrics: "When someday this rain turns to snow / And slowly consumes this sadness / I'll be greeted by new hope.

Track listing

Oricon Sales Chart (Japan)

The single was certified gold by the RIAJ for having more than 100,000 copies shipped to stores.

References

Notes

Sources

2010 singles
Yui (singer) songs
Japanese television drama theme songs
Songs written by Yui (singer)
2010 songs
Sony Music Entertainment Japan singles